Finland competed at the 1994 Winter Paralympics in Lillehammer, Norway. 18 competitors from Finland won 24 medals including 7 gold, 6 silver and 11 bronze and finished 7th in the medal table.

See also 
 Finland at the Paralympics
 Finland at the 1994 Winter Olympics

References 

1994
1994 in Finnish sport
Nations at the 1994 Winter Paralympics